Echarate District (or Echarati) is one of fourteen districts of the province La Convención in Peru. The town of Echarte, near the Urubamba River, is the capital of the district. In 2016, part of Echarte district was incorporated into the newly-created Megantoni District.

See also
 Kuntur Sinqa
 Machiguenga Communal Reserve
 Megantoni National Sanctuary
 Otishi National Park
 Pongo de Mainique
 Vilcabamba, Capital of the Neo-Inca State, 1539–1572.

References